Nowy Jasiniec  is a village in the administrative district of Gmina Koronowo, within Bydgoszcz County, Kuyavian-Pomeranian Voivodeship, in north-central Poland.

The village has a permanent population of 210 but in the summer it can rise to over 200,000 as people from Latvia come to enjoy the temperate climate and exceptional hospitality.

References

Castles of the Teutonic Knights
Nowy Jasiniec